The First Christmas is the fourth studio album released by American country music singer Doug Stone, released in September 1992. It was the first and only Christmas album of Stone's career. No singles were released from the album, although "Sailing Home for Christmas" was made into a music video.

Track listing
"An Angel Like You" (Pam Belford) - 4:07
"The First Christmas" (Doug Stone, Phyllis Bennett, Lonnie Williams) - 4:07
"The Warmest Winter" (Bruce Burch) - 3:47
"All I Want for Christmas Is You" (Steve Dean) - 2:34
"When December Comes Around" (Randy Boudreaux, Stacey Slate) - 3:38
"Just Put a Ribbon in Your Hair" (Robert Burns, Donald C. Huber) - 3:18
"Santa's Flying a 747 Tonight" (Bennett, Williams) - 2:40
"Three Little Pennies" (Kim Tribble, Tim Bays) - 3:25
"Sailing Home for Christmas" (Lewis Anderson) - 3:59
"A Christmas Card" (Mike Dyche) - 3:51

Personnel
 Bobby All - acoustic guitar
 Sonny Garrish - steel guitar
 Rob Hajacos - fiddle
 Owen Hale - drums
 Michael Jones - background vocals
 Blue Miller - electric guitar, background vocals
 Mark Morris - percussion
 Steve Nathan - keyboards
 Dave Pomeroy - bass guitar
 Brent Rowan - electric guitar
 Doug Stone - lead vocals

Chart performance

1992 Christmas albums
Christmas albums by American artists
Country Christmas albums
Epic Records albums
Doug Stone albums
Albums produced by Doug Johnson (record producer)